This is the list of Myanmar National Literature Award winners since 1962.

1962
National Literary Awards for 1962. They were:

1971

1972
 Mya Than Tint, Translation: War and Peace

1977
Kyaw Win , Novel:Nout Aww Naga
Nu Yin, Poems
Hla Myo Nwe,Fiction

1978
 Mya Than Tint, Translation: Gone with the Wind

1979

1986
 Moe Moe (Inya) for Moe Moe's Short Stories
 Maung Nyein Thu for Mya Ah Phuutwe Thit Thit Waie and Youth Short Stories

1987

Saya Zawgyi for Ancient Bagan and Other Poems

1988
 Mya Than Tint, Translation: Dream of the Red Chamber

1989
Saw Mon Nyin, Myanmar Women’s Clothing and Hairstyles

1992
National Literary Awards for 1992 were announced on 2 December 1993. They were:

No awards were made for Novels, Drama, Youth Literature, Translation (general knowledge), General Knowledge (science) or Political Literature.

1995

2003
Awards for 2003 were presented in December 2004. 
The Lifelong National Literary Award was won by writer Htay Maung. 
Other winners of National Literary Awards were Hsaung Win Lat, Khin Khin Htoo, Salin Phone Kyaw, Daw Mi Mi Lay, Maung Thit Sar, Myinmu Maung Naing Moe, Than Aung (Anyamyay), Hlaing Thin, Maung Tun Thu, Ma Kyan, Kyaw Oo, Naing Shwe Moe, Kyu Kyu Thin and Dr Ma Tin Win.

2005

Award winners in 2005 were:

2007
The 2007 award winners included:

2008
The 2008 awards were presented at the Ministry of Information on 31 December 2009. Winners were:

2009

The 2009 awards were presented at the hall of the Ministry of Information in Nay Pyi Taw on 31 December 2010. 
The Lifetime Achievement for National Literary Award was presented to Dr Khin Maung Nyunt.
Other winners of literary awards were Linka Yi Kyaw, Maung Cheint, Maung Ni Win, Maung Khin Min (Danubyu), U Kyaw Than (Phekon), Min Shwe Min (Insein), Ye Tint, Ma Kyan, Pho Swe (Timber Enterprise) and U Saw Aung Hla Tun.

2010
2010 award winners were:

2011
2011 award winners were:

2012
The 2012 awards was presented at the National Theatre, Yangon on 3 December 2013. 2012 award winners were:

2013
The 2013 awards were presented at the National Theatre, Yangon on 22 November 2014. 2013 award winners were:

2014
Mya Zin, Paw Tun and Ko Lay won lifetime achievement awards.

References

Burmese literary awards
Myanmar National Literature Awards
Myanmar
Myanmar National Literature Award